Buhrer is a surname and may refer to:

Dennis Bührer (born 1983), German football player and manager
Gerold Bührer (born 1948), Swiss politician
Jamie Buhrer (born 1989), Australian rugby league player
Marco Bührer (born 1979), Swiss ice hockey player
Nicolas Bührer (born 1944), former car racing driver
Stephen Buhrer (1825-1907), Democratic mayor of Cleveland from 1867 to 1870
Thomas Bührer (born 1968), Swiss orienteering competitor